Helena Suková and Natasha Zvereva were the defending champions but did not compete that year.

Alexandra Fusai and Nathalie Tauziat won in the final 6–4, 6–3 against Yayuk Basuki and Caroline Vis.

Seeds
Champion seeds are indicated in bold text while text in italics indicates the round in which those seeds were eliminated.

 Alexandra Fusai /  Nathalie Tauziat (champions)
 Yayuk Basuki /  Caroline Vis (final)
 Elena Likhovtseva /  Ai Sugiyama (semifinals)
 Naoko Kijimuta /  Nana Miyagi (semifinals)

Draw

External links
 1998 Internationaux de Strasbourg Doubles Draw

1998
1998 WTA Tour
1998 in French sport